Zeta Crucis, Latinized from ζ Crucis, is a binary star system in the southern constellation of Crux. It is visible to the naked eye with an apparent magnitude of 4.06m. ζ Crucis is located at about 360 light-years from the Sun. It is a member of the Lower Centaurus–Crux subgroup of the Scorpius–Centaurus association.

This is a double-lined spectroscopic binary star system. The spectrum matches a B-type main-sequence star with a stellar classification of B2.5 V. There is a faint visual companion with an apparent magnitude of 12.49.

References

B-type main-sequence stars
Spectroscopic binaries
Double stars
Lower Centaurus Crux
Crucis, Zeta
Crux (constellation)
Durchmusterung objects
106983
060009
4679